Elli Medeiros (born 18 January 1956) is a Uruguayan-French singer and actress.

Career

Stinky Toys 
Originally from Uruguay, Medeiros moved to Paris, France, at the age of 14, dropped out of high school a couple of years later and joined the punk band Stinky Toys.

Elli et Jacno 
After the group disbanded, Medeiros joined another Stinky Toy member Jacno to form the electropop duo Elli et Jacno. Together they released several albums, one of them the soundtrack to an Éric Rohmer film Les nuits de la pleine lune.

Solo 
The singer went solo in 1986. The songs, "Toi mon toit" (1986) and "A bailar calypso" (1987), were big hits in France and had a more Latin sound than her previous records.

She sang back-up vocals on several of pop star Etienne Daho's songs from his 1996 album Eden. She also helped co-write his song "Me manquer" from the same album.

Elli Medeiros appears in a number of French films and has worked with, among others, Olivier Assayas and Philippe Garrel.

Filmography 
 1978: Copyright : Anne
 1980: Rectangle – Deux chansons de Jacno (music video) : Elli
 1982: Tokyo no yami (Laissé inachevé à Tokyo)
 1982:     L'Enfant secret : The whore
 1991: Petits travaux tranquilles : Paule
 1991:     Paris s'éveille
 1997: Tempête dans un verre d'eau
 1998: Il suffirait d'un pont
 1998:     Fin août, début septembre
 1999: Derrière la porte
 1999:     Pourquoi pas moi? : Malou
 1999:     Venus Beauty Institute (Vénus beauté (institut)) : Mlle Evelyne
 2000: Mamirolle : Irène
 2000:     Paris, mon petit corps est bien las de ce grand monde : The girl
 2000:     Jet Set : Danièle Joubert
 2002: Lulu : Lulu
 2002:     House Hunting : The girl
 2003: Rosa la nuit
 2005: Panorama : The mother
 2007: Après lui : Pauline
 2008: Leonera : Sofia
 2018: Amanda : Eve

Discography 
 1977: grey album (Polydor) Stinky Toys
 1979: yellow album (Vogue) Stinky Toys
 1980: Tout va sauter (Vogue) Elli et Jacno
 1981: Inedits 77-81 (Celluloid/EJC/Vogue) Elli et Jacno
 1982: Boomerang (Celluloid/EJC/ Vogue) Elli et Jacno
 1984: Les Nuits de la pleine lune Bof 'Les nuits de la pleine lune d'Éric Rohmer (EJC/CBS) Elli et Jacno
 1987: Bom Bom... (Barclay)
 1989: Elli (Barclay)
 1994" Les Symphonies de poche compilation de Elli et Jacno (Virgin)
 1998: Best of Elli (Barclay)
 2006: E M (V2)

References

External links 

 

1956 births
Living people
20th-century  French women singers
French film actresses
French-language singers
Uruguayan emigrants to France
Women punk rock singers